Sucker Punch is a 2008 action film written and directed by Malcolm Martin and starring Danny John-Jules, Gordon Alexander, Tom Hardy, Antonio Fargas and Ian Freeman.

Premise
A bare-knuckle fighter teams up with a small-time con artist involved in the underworld of backstreet boxers.

References

External links

2008 films
2008 action films
2000s sports films
British boxing films
2000s English-language films
2000s British films